This is a list of scheduled monuments and listed buildings in the English city of Exeter, Devon.

Scheduled monuments 
 Exeter Cathedral Green
 Exeter city wall
 St Nicholas Priory
 Medieval Exe Bridge
 The remains of St Catherines Chapel (Catherine Street)
 Rougemont Castle
 The settlement of Danes Castle
 The remains of The Hall of the Vicar's Choral (South Street)
 The Underground Passages

Grade I listed buildings 
 The Guildhall (High Street)
 Cathedral Church of Saint Peter (Exeter Cathedral)
 St Martin's Church (Cathedral Close)
 Mols coffee shop (Cathedral Close)
 No. 5 Cathedral Close
 No. 8, 9, and 9a Cathedral Close
 The Law Library (Cathedral Close)
 No. 10 Cathedral Close
 The Bishop's Palace (Palace Gate)
 Gatehouse to The Bishop's Palace (Palace Gate)
 Presentation of St Mary Covent School (Palace Gate)
 George's Chapel (South Street)
 St Mary Arches Church (Mary Arches Street)
 St Nicholas Priory (The Mint)
 Church of St Mary's Steps (West Street)
 The Customs House (The Quay)
 Quay House (The Quay)
 Church of St Michael's and All Angels (Mount Dinham)
 Church of St Thomas (Cowick Street)
 Church of St David's (St David's Hill)

Grade II* listed buildings 
 No. 40 High Street
 No. 41-42 High Street
 No. 46 High Street
 No. 225-226 High Street
 No. 227 High Street
 Church of St Stephen's (High Street)
 Church of St Petrock's (High Street)
 No. 1-2 Catherine Street
 No. 1 The Cloisters 
 The Old Deanery (The Cloisters)
 Church House (Bear Street)
 No. 2 Cathedral Close
 No. 3 Cathedral Close
 No. 4 Cathedral Close
 No. 6 Cathedral close
 The Devon and Exeter Institution (Cathedral Close)
 The Devon County War Memorial and Processional Way
 Notaries House (Cathedral Close)
 No. 15-15a Cathedral Close
 No. 67 South Street
 Wynard's Hospital (Magdalan Street)
 Dean Clarke House (Former RD&E Hospital) (Southernhay)
 No. 1-10 Southernhay West
 No. 18-24 Southernhay West
 Southernhay House (Southernhay East), onetime residence of Sir Henry Russell, 2nd Baronet, an India mogul 
 Chichester Place (Southernhay East)
 Barnfield Crescent
 No. 13-15 Dix's Field
 The Castle Courthouse (Rougemont Castle)
 Rougemont House (Castle Street)
 No. 1 Upper Paul Street
 Civic Hall Higher Market (Queen Street)
 Church of St Pancras (Guildhall Shopping Centre)
 The Synagogue (Mary Arches Street)
 St Olaves House (Barthowlomew Street)
 No. 21 The Mint
 The Church of St Olave (Fore Street)
 Tucker's Hall (Fore Street)
 No. 5-7 West Street
 The Harbourmaster's Office (The Quay)
 The Fish Market (The Quay)
 No. 1-4 King's Wharf (The Quay)
 No. 6-11 King's Wharf (The Quay)
 Warehouse Vaults (The Quay)
 Colleton Crescent
 Colleton Villa (Friar's Gate)
 Sidwell Street Methodist Church 
 The Imperial Hotel (New North Road)
 Old Tudor House (Tudor Street)
 Chapel at St Anne's Almshouses (Old Tiverton Road)
 Bellair (Devon County Hall)
 Devon County Hall 
 Old Matford House (Matford Road)
 No. 1-5 Pennsylvania Crescent
 No. 1-6 Pennsylvania Park

References 

 English Heritage - The National Heritage List

Scheduled
Exeter
Exeter
Lists
List
Scheduled monuments in Devon